Catwalk is a 1971 Australian TV series created by Tony Morphett. It was a spin-off of an episode of the TV series Dynasty.

References

External links
Catwalk at IMDb
Catwalk at Classic Australian TV
Catwalk at National Film and Sound Archive

Seven Network original programming
Australian drama television series
1971 Australian television series debuts